Jharkhand Dham (also known as Jharkhandi) is a temple of Lord Shiva and significant pilgrim center, located near Dhanwar in Giridih District, Jharkhand, India.

Geography

Location

It is approximately 55 km from Giridih and 10 km from Rajdhanwar. A unique feature of this place is buildings, which are roofless.

Note: The map alongside presents some of the notable locations in the district. All places marked in the map are linked in the larger full screen map.

Culture
There is a temple devoted to Lord Shiva, where an annual fair takes place. The place is crowded by the Shiva devotees on the occasion of Maha Shivaratri. Every year in shrawan month (Hindu month i.e. mostly some part of  July to August) a fair takes place of shiva devotees. It's believed that more blessings can be received if we put the Ganges jal (water) on lord Shiva.

Also many peoples come to  worship in every Monday and also in full moon day (Purnima) of every  Hindu Month.

Many marriages have done every year and blessed by the lord Shiva.

In south west side of temple crossing the Irga river.

Education
Sanskrit Hindi Vidyapith was established at Jharkhanddham, Giridih, in 1967. It is an institute specializing in Sanskrit, but also offers other courses. It is affiliated to Vinoba Bhave University. It has hostel facilities.

References

Giridih district
Hindu temples in Jharkhand
Shiva temples in Jharkhand

Shiva temples in India